Kelid Bar (also Romanized as Kelīd Bar; also known as Kilirber) is a village in Taher Gurab Rural District, in the Central District of Sowme'eh Sara County, Gilan Province, Iran. At the 2006 census, its population was 633, in 172 families.

References 

Populated places in Sowme'eh Sara County